Betthorus was a Roman legionary fortress on the Limes Arabicus. It is located in today's  (from Legio), Karak Governorate, Jordan, north-east of Al Karak. The place is in proximity to the spring , in a wadi of the same name, that flows into Wadi Mujib.

A church is dated to 500. It was damaged by earthquakes in 363, 505, and 551.

Legio IV Martia was stationed there in the 4th century. The troops were removed around 530, after the Ghassanids were charged with the defense of the border. In the 1980s Thomas S. Parker excavated the site.

External links

Plan, map and bibliography
Photos of Lejjun at the American Center of Research

References

Archaeological sites in Jordan
Roman legionary fortresses in Jordan
Roman fortifications in Arabia Petraea